Dylan McDermott (born Mark Anthony McDermott; October 26, 1961) is an American actor. He is known for his role as lawyer and law firm head Bobby Donnell on the legal drama series The Practice, which earned him a Golden Globe Award for Best Performance by an Actor in a Television Series – Drama and a nomination for the Primetime Emmy Award for Outstanding Lead Actor in a Drama Series.

McDermott is also known for his roles in four seasons (first, second, eighth and ninth) of the FX horror anthology series American Horror Story, subtitled Murder House, Asylum, Apocalypse, and 1984 portraying Ben Harmon, Johnny Morgan and Bruce, respectively. He also starred as narcotics crime lord Richard Wheatley on the Law & Order: Special Victims Unit spinoff Law & Order: Organized Crime; Lt. Carter Shaw on the TNT series Dark Blue; in two short-lived CBS dramas, Hostages and Stalker; and in the 1994 remake of the film Miracle on 34th Street. In 2022, he joined FBI: Most Wanted as the new lead, replacing the departing Julian McMahon.

Early life
Mark Anthony McDermott was born on October 26, 1961, in Waterbury, Connecticut, to Diane and Richard McDermott. He has a younger sister, Robin. Diane was 15 and Richard was 17 when McDermott was born; by 1967, the couple had divorced, and Diane and her two children were living with her mother, Avis Marino. On February 9, 1967, Diane died of an accidental gunshot wound.

McDermott and his sister were raised by their maternal grandmother Avis in Waterbury. As a teenager, he began taking trips to visit his biological father, who owned the West Fourth Street Saloon in Greenwich Village, New York. McDermott worked in his father's bar, serving drinks and breaking up fights. He also fast-talked his way into the Mudd Club and Studio 54.

McDermott was uncomfortable with himself as a teenager, saying he had a "Dorothy Hamill hairdo". He began imitating his acting heroes, such as Marlon Brando and Humphrey Bogart, adopting their demeanor. In 1979, McDermott graduated from Holy Cross High School in Waterbury.

McDermott's father's third wife was playwright Eve Ensler, who adopted McDermott when he was 15 and she was 23. She later divorced his father. Ensler, with whom McDermott has remained close, encouraged him to pursue an acting career, and began writing roles for him into her plays. After Ensler suffered a miscarriage, he took the name Dylan, the name planned for her unborn child. He then graduated from the Jesuit-run Fordham University with a BA in 1983, as well as studying under Sanford Meisner at the Neighborhood Playhouse School of the Theatre in New York City.

Career
McDermott made his screen debut in Hamburger Hill in 1987 before starring in the 1989 film Steel Magnolias opposite Julia Roberts as her husband Jackson Latcherie. He also starred in Twister, a film about a man trying to rescue his girlfriend and daughter from a tornado storm. The same year brought Neon Empire, a film about the rise and fall of one man in Las Vegas. However, his first big break as an actor was in the film In the Line of Fire. Through his connection with Clint Eastwood, McDermott was able to land his first major gig in The Practice. The show expanded McDermott's stardom, and he made People list of the "50 Most Beautiful People in the World 1998" with the magazine calling him "a prime-time heartthrob". He got this distinction again in 2000. In 1994, McDermott starred in Miracle on 34th Street as Lawyer Bryan Bedford, which has grossed $46.3 million dollars in the Worldwide Box Office. 

Despite his success on The Practice, McDermott was cut from the show. Executive producer David E. Kelley cited "economic and creative realities" as a result of pressure from ABC to reduce costs. McDermott did appear in the final two episodes of the final season.

In 2004, McDermott starred alongside Julianna Margulies four-part mini-series The Grid, playing FBI Special Agent Max Canary in an anti-terrorist unit. Returning to theater in 2006, the actor played a returned soldier suffering from post-traumatic stress disorder in the Ensler's play The Treatment. In 2007, McDermott starred in the television series Big Shots. Due to low viewership, the show was canceled in January 2008 after 11 episodes without completing the planned 13-episode season. On October 30, 2008, TV Guide reported that McDermott was due to co-star alongside Shannen Doherty in the film Burning Palms, a satire based on Los Angeles stereotypes told through five intertwining storylines.

Beginning in 2009, McDermott starred in the TNT drama Dark Blue, playing a veteran cop who heads a squad of undercover LAPD officers. The show ran for two seasons, each consisting of ten episodes. In 2011, McDermott starred on American Horror Story on FX as Ben Harmon, a psychologist and cheating husband. He returned to the second season as a new character due to the series' anthology format, this time portraying Johnny Morgan. In 2012, he appeared in three films: The Campaign, playing Tim Wattley, a campaign manager, The Perks of Being a Wallflower, as the father of main character Charlie (Logan Lerman), and Nobody Walks, as Leroy. He appeared in the action thriller Olympus Has Fallen as a treacherous Secret Service Agent who helps a group of terrorists seize control of the White House.

In May 2013, McDermott launched his first photography exhibition in Montreal, Quebec, Canada, at Avenue Art Gallery as part of a collaboration with art agent Marina Cutler. The exhibition, titled The Dylan Project, Make some Noise!, tied his support for The V-Day Organization and love of photography together as the project is a way to bring attention and funds to this organization that supports women in various ways who have suffered violent acts of aggression. McDermott and Cutler have plans to bring The Dylan Project to other locations. Also in 2013, McDermott starred in the short-lived CBS television series Hostages as FBI agent Duncan Carlisle. In 2014, McDermott began starring on another short-lived CBS television series Stalker in one of the lead roles, portraying Detective Jack Larsen opposite Maggie Q.

In 2019, McDermott had a recurring role on The Politician starring opposite January Jones, as the father of Lucy Boynton's character. In 2020, McDermott starred in Hollywood, a limited series for Netflix. He then went on to be cast as narcotics crime lord Richard Wheatley on the Elliot Stabler-centric Law & Order: Special Victims Unit spin-off Law & Order: Organized Crime, which premiered in April 2021. In season 1, McDermott as Wheatley was a series regular, but moved to a recurring role for season 2. Coinciding with his departure from Organized Crime, McDermott was tapped as the new lead on Dick Wolf's FBI: Most Wanted, following the departure of Julian McMahon. His first episode aired in April 2022.

Personal life
McDermott married actress Shiva Rose on November 19, 1995. They have two daughters, Colette and Charlotte. Colette's birth is prominently featured in Ensler's The Vagina Monologues. Colette graduated from Barnard College, of which McDermott was also a trustee. On September 27, 2007, People confirmed that McDermott and Rose had separated. On May 16, 2008, it was reported that McDermott had filed for divorce from Rose. The divorce was finalized on January 2, 2009. 

Having met on set in early 2014, on January 14, 2015, it was announced he was engaged to his Stalker co-star Maggie Q. In 2017, they stated that they were not in any rush to have an actual wedding ceremony. In February 2019, the couple split after a four-year engagement.

McDermott has been featured in magazines such as Men's Health. In 1999, he was a finalist in the GQ "Man of the Year" issue.

McDermott is a recovering alcoholic. He has been sober since 1984.

Filmography

Film

Television

Theatre

Awards and nominations

References

External links
 
 

1961 births
20th-century American male actors
21st-century American male actors
Actors from Waterbury, Connecticut
American male film actors
American male stage actors
American male television actors
Best Drama Actor Golden Globe (television) winners
Fordham University alumni
Living people
Male actors from Connecticut
Neighborhood Playhouse School of the Theatre alumni